New Hampshire Route 112 (abbreviated NH 112) is a  east–west state highway in northern New Hampshire. The highway winds across the state, connecting Bath to Conway through the heart of the scenic and mountainous White Mountain National Forest.

The eastern portion of NH 112 is known as the  Kancamagus Highway, running  through the White Mountains from Lincoln to Conway.  of the highway have been designated a National Scenic Byway by the United States Department of Transportation under the name "Kancamagus Scenic Byway". The highway is known for its views of autumn foliage and is a popular drive in September and October for leaf peeping tourism.

The Kancamagus Highway stays open all winter, although it occasionally closes for short periods while crews clear heavy snows. Its only major intersection is Bear Notch Road, which connects with the town of Bartlett, but it is closed all winter.

Much of the western portion of NH 112 is also in the White Mountain National Forest, passing through Kinsman Notch with the Lost River tourist attraction. The section between NH 116 and North Woodstock is called Lost River Road.

Route description

Bath to Lincoln 
The highway runs southeast along the Wild Ammonoosuc River, then climbs through Kinsman Notch. NH 112 crosses into the town limits of Woodstock and descends along the Lost River, meeting the northern terminus of NH 118 before continuing east to the village of North Woodstock. The route passes through the center of the village, crossing US 3 and interchanging with I-93 before entering Lincoln. NH 112 passes through downtown Lincoln as Main Street.

Lincoln to Conway (Kancamagus Highway) 

The Kancamagus Highway portion of NH 112 begins just east of the town center. Following a series of hairpin turns, NH 112 crosses the height of land at  Kancamagus Pass and begins to descend along the Swift River in the Saco River watershed, which it does for its remaining . Eventually the highway leaves the National Forest and enters the town of Conway, where it terminates at Main Street (NH 16 / NH 113) west of downtown.

The Kancamagus Highway is a very popular tourist destination due to its many scenic views and locations. Two scenic outlook sites are located along the Kancamagus Highway, including one from near the crest of Kancamagus Pass. There are six National Forest campground sites, along with numerous hiking trails.

History

The Kancamagus Highway opened in August 1959, after two dead-end stretches of road were linked, creating a connection between US 3 in Lincoln and NH 16 in Conway. Locally known as "The Kanc", the road was paved in 1964, and in the winter of 1966–67 it was plowed for the first time.

The highway is named after Kancamagus (pronounced "cain-kah-MAW-gus", "Fearless One"), third and final sagamore of the Penacook Confederacy of Native American tribes. Nephew of Wonalancet and grandson of Passaconaway, Kancamagus ruled what is now southern New Hampshire. After English settlers arrested a number of Pennacook tribe members, he was forced to make the decision in 1691 to move north into upper New Hampshire and what is now Quebec, Canada.

On February 9, 2004, University of Massachusetts Amherst student Maura Murray crashed her car on Route 112 near Woodsville. She disappeared shortly after this incident and her fate remains unknown.

Following Hurricane Irene in August 2011, two sections of NH 112 were closed, pending repair work and evaluation of damage. The Kancamagus Highway was closed from the Sabbaday Falls picnic area across Kancamagus Pass to the Discovery Trail parking area in the eastern part of Lincoln. A section of the western portion of NH 112 along the Wild Ammonoosuc River was closed; as of September 6, 2011, a single lane of the western section had been reopened. As of late June 2012, the highway had been completely reopened, though some stretches were in the process of being repaved.

Major intersections

Images along the highway

References

External links

Kancamagus Scenic Byway from FHWA
kancamagushighway.com, unofficial website
New Hampshire State Route 112 on Flickr

112
Transportation in Grafton County, New Hampshire
Transportation in Carroll County, New Hampshire